Sturgeon Composite High School is a public school located in Namao, Alberta.

External links 
 Official website

High schools in Alberta
Educational institutions in Canada with year of establishment missing